General elections were held in Thailand on 12 December 1957. They were the first elections after the coup led by Sarit Thanarat.

The new Sahaphum Party emerged as the largest party in parliament with 40 of the 160 elected seats, although with 59 MPs, independents were the largest bloc in Parliament. Voter turnout was 44%.

Results

References

1957 12
Thailand
1957 in Thailand
1957